The Cognitive Research Corporation Driving Simulator (CRCDS) is a PC-based driving simulator used to test the effects of various factors (such as age, trauma, neurologic disease, alcohol and fatigue) on driving performance. The CRCDS software is ported from the National Advanced Driving Simulator (NADS).

Specifications
Cognitive Research Corporation (CRC) designed the CRCDS for use in pharmaceutical research. The system consists of a single PC, three 21-inch LCD monitors (105-degree field of view), a full-size steering wheel and pedals, an instrument panel display, a 2.1 audio system, a tactile transducer, and a separate display for the Coach/Instructor.

Simulator scenarios

Country Vigilance scenario
The monotonous Country Vigilance scenario has been demonstrated to be sensitive to detect the effects of fatigue or sleepiness on driving performance. This scenario has been useful in evaluating patients with a variety of conditions including Obstructive Sleep Apnea (OSA), measuring the effects of sleep deprivation, chronic primary insomnia, and is sensitive to CNS depressants (e.g., alcohol and sedating antihistamines).

Screening scenario
This is a brief drive that comprises several minutes of the Country Vigilance Scenario. The purpose of this drive is to provide an introductory experience for the participant and to determine if they are likely to experience simulator sickness when using the driving simulator.

Familiarization scenario
The purpose of this drive is to provide standardized instructions on operation of the driving simulator. It comprises several minutes of the Country Vigilance Scenario, followed by several minutes of the Country Vigilance Scenario with a divided attention task.

Practice scenario
This scenario was designed to provide the participant with standardized practice of the driving tasks being completed during testing. The Practice Scenario consists of several minutes of the Country Vigilance Scenario Driving.

References

External links
KET Tests and KET Tickets

Driving simulators